Petrophile arcuata is a species of flowering plant in the family Proteaceae and is endemic to southwestern Western Australia. It is a spreading shrub with cylindrical leaves and oval to spherical heads of hairy yellowish flowers.

Description
Flowering occurs from September to October and the fruit is a nut, fused with others in a more or less spherical head  in diameter.

Taxonomy
Petrophile arcuata was first formally described in 1995 by Donald Bruce Foreman in Flora of Australia. The specific epithet (arcuata) means "curved like a bow", referring to leaves.

Distribution and habitat
This petrophile grows in scrub along the Great Eastern Highway between Southern Cross and Coolgardie, extending south to Peak Charles in the Avon Wheatbelt, Coolgardie and Mallee biogeographic regions of southwestern Western Australia.

Conservation status
Petrophile arcuata is classified as "not threatened" by the Western Australian Government Department of Parks and Wildlife.

References

arcuata
Eudicots of Western Australia
Endemic flora of Western Australia
Plants described in 1995